
Year 289 BC was a year of the pre-Julian Roman calendar. At the time it was known as the Year of the Consulship of Corvus and Noctua (or, less frequently, year 465 Ab urbe condita). The denomination 289 BC for this year has been used since the early medieval period, when the Anno Domini calendar era became the prevalent method in Europe for naming years.

Events
By place
Sicily
 The tyrant of Syracuse, Agathocles, dies after restoring the Syracusan democracy on his death bed by stating that he does not want his sons to succeed him as king. However, the resulting dissension among his family about the succession leads to a renewal of Carthaginian power in Sicily.

 China 
 General Sima Cuo of the State of Qin attacks the State of Wei, recaptures the city of Yuan and captures the cities of Heyong and Jueqiao.

Births

Deaths
 Agathocles, tyrant of Syracuse, Sicily from 317 BC and self-styled king of Sicily after 304 BC (b. 361 BC)
 Mencius (Mèng Zǐ or Meng Zhu), Chinese philosopher (approximate date) (b.  372 BC)

References